OPCA may refer to:

 Office of Public and Congressional Affairs, a part of the US Federal Bureau of Investigation
 Olivopontocerebellar atrophy, a brain disorder
 Orange Park Christian Academy, Orange Park, Florida, U.S.
 Organised pseudolegal commercial arguments, a type of pseudolaw
 Outer membrane protein OpcA